Ignorance is the debut studio album by American thrash metal band Sacred Reich. It was released on October 13, 1987 by Metal Blade Records, and was followed up by the 1988 EP, Surf Nicaragua. 

The album was co-produced by the band and Bill Metoyer, who had previously engineered most of Slayer's early work. Metal Blade reissued the album and released a 30th anniversary version of it with its original artwork on September 8, 2017, with LP and Digipak CD versions being available.

The album is dedicated to Coronado High School and the Class of '87.

Reception

In August 2014, Revolver placed Ignorance on its "14 Thrash Albums You Need to Own" list.

Track listing

Personnel
 Phil Rind – vocals, bass
 Wiley Arnett – lead guitar
 Jason Rainey – rhythm guitar
 Greg Hall – drums

 Dan Kelly – vocals
 Jeff Martinek – lead guitar
 Jason Rainey – rhythm guitar 
 Mike Andre – bass
 Ray Nay – drums

Additional Personnel 
 Produced by Bill Metoyer and Sacred Reich
 Engineered by Bill Metoyer
 Assistant engineered by Richard McIntosh, Scott Campbell, Ken Paulakovich, and Bryan Carlstrom
 Mixed at Track Record
 Executive produced by Brian Slagel
 Artwork by Paul Stottler

References

External links
Sacred Reich Official Website

1987 debut albums
Metal Blade Records albums
Sacred Reich albums